Captain John Franks Vallentin, VC (14 May 1882 − 7 November 1914) was a British Army officer and an English recipient of the Victoria Cross (VC), the highest and most prestigious award for gallantry in the face of the enemy that can be awarded to British and Commonwealth forces.

Vallentin was born to distiller Grimble Vallentin and Lucy Ann Vallentin née Finnis. He was the nephew of Brevet-Major John Maximilian Vallentin (1865–1901) and of the noted naturalist Rupert Vallentin (1859–1934). His grandfather Sir James Vallentin (1814–1870) was Knight Sheriff of London, and his cousin Archibald Thomas Pechey, the lyricist and author, adapted the family name for his nom de plume 'Valentine'.

He was commissioned as a second lieutenant in the 6th (Militia) Battalion of the Rifle Brigade (The Prince Consort's Own) in 1899, and promoted to lieutenant in the battalion on 25 July 1900. He served in the Second Boer War in South Africa where he was attached to the 3rd (Militia) Battalion of the Royal Sussex Regiment. Following the end of hostilities, he left Cape Town on board the SS Dominion in August 1902 with the other men of the Royal Sussex, and arrived at Southampton the next month.

He later transferred to a Territorial Force battalion of the South Staffordshire Regiment, and then to the Regular Army.

Vallentin was 32 years old, and a captain in the 1st Battalion, South Staffordshire Regiment, British Army during the First World War when the following deed took place at the first Battle of Ypres for which he was awarded the VC.

On 7 November 1914 at Zillebeke, Belgium, when leading an attack against the Germans under very heavy fire, Captain Vallentin was struck down and on rising to continue the attack, was immediately killed. The capture of the enemy's trenches which immediately followed was in a great measure due to the confidence which the men had in their captain, arising from his many previous acts of great bravery and ability.

References

Monuments to Courage (David Harvey, 1999)
The Register of the Victoria Cross (This England, 1997)
VCs of the First World War: 1914 (Gerald Gliddon, 1994)

1882 births
1914 deaths
People educated at Wellington College, Berkshire
South Staffordshire Regiment officers
Rifle Brigade officers
British Militia officers
British World War I recipients of the Victoria Cross
British Army personnel of World War I
British military personnel killed in World War I
People from Lambeth
British Army personnel of the Second Boer War
Royal Sussex Regiment officers
British Army recipients of the Victoria Cross
Military personnel from London